George Williams Fulcher (1795–1855), was an English poet and miscellaneous writer. He was also a practical botanist.

Annual
Fulcher, born in 1795, carried on the business of a bookseller, stationer, and printer at Sudbury in Suffolk, where in 1825 he issued the first number of the Sudbury Pocket Book, an annual which he continued to publish during his life, and to the pages of which Bernard Barton, William and Mary Howitt, James Montgomery and other lesser known writers contributed. A selection from these contributions appeared under the title of 'Fulcher's Poetical Miscellany' in 1841.

Publications
Fulcher also started in 1838 a monthly miscellany of prose and verse entitled Fulcher's Sudbury Journal, but this was not continued beyond the year. He made an effort to treat pauperism poetically, publishing The Village Paupers, and Other Poems. "The Village Paupers", in heroic couplets, betrays in almost every line the influence of Crabbe and of Oliver Goldsmith's The Deserted Village. Of his miscellaneous poems, "The Dying Child" is best appreciated.

Fulcher also published The Ladies' Memorandum Book and Poetical Miscellany (1852 ff.) and The Farmer's Day-book, which reached a sixth edition in 1854.

On his death on 19 June 1855, he was engaged on a life of Gainsborough, a Sudbury man. This work, embodying much original research and written in a terse, scholarly style, was completed by his son, E. S. Fulcher, and published in London in 1856. A second edition appeared the same year.

Interests
Fulcher was a diligent student throughout his life, particularly in relation to Crabbe and Cowper. Boswell's Life of Samuel Johnson (1791) was another of his favourite books. He was a practical botanist and sensitive to the beauties of nature. He took an active interest in local affairs, as one of the magistrates of the borough of Sudbury, president of its board of guardians and several times mayor. He gave much to charities.

George William Fulcher was buried in the churchyard of St Gregory's Church, Sudbury. Townspeople closed their shops, and the mayor, corporation, and magistrates of the borough following the bier.

References

1795 births
1855 deaths
19th-century English poets
English male poets
19th-century English male writers